Jean Wicki (born 18 June 1933) is a Swiss bobsledder who competed in the late 1960s and early 1970s. Competing in two Winter Olympics, he won three medals with one gold (Four-man: 1972) and two bronzes (Two-man: 1972, Four-man: 1968).

References
 Bobsleigh two-man Olympic medalists 1932-56 and since 1964
 Bobsleigh four-man Olympic medalists for 1924, 1932-56, and since 1964
 DatabaseOlympics.com profile

1933 births
Bobsledders at the 1968 Winter Olympics
Bobsledders at the 1972 Winter Olympics
Living people
Swiss male bobsledders
Olympic bobsledders of Switzerland
Olympic gold medalists for Switzerland
Olympic bronze medalists for Switzerland
Olympic medalists in bobsleigh
Medalists at the 1972 Winter Olympics
Medalists at the 1968 Winter Olympics
20th-century Swiss people